In enzymology, a 3-hydroxycyclohexanone dehydrogenase is an enzyme that catalyzes the chemical reaction

3-hydroxycyclohexanone + acceptor  cyclohexane-1,3-dione + reduced acceptor

Thus, the two substrates of this enzyme are 3-hydroxycyclohexanone and acceptor, whereas its two products are cyclohexane-1,3-dione and reduced acceptor.

This enzyme belongs to the family of oxidoreductases, specifically those acting on the CH-OH group of donor with other acceptors.  The systematic name of this enzyme class is 3-hydroxycyclohexanone:acceptor 1-oxidoreductase.

References

 

EC 1.1.99
Enzymes of unknown structure